The 1960–61 Romanian Hockey League Season was the 31st season of the Romanian Hockey League. Four teams participated in the league, and CCA Bucuresti won the championship.

Regular season

External links
hochei.net

Rom
Romanian Hockey League seasons
1960–61 in Romanian ice hockey